Rabindra Kumar Rana (23 January 1947 – 23 March 2022) was a member of the 14th Lok Sabha of India. He represented the Khagaria constituency of Bihar and was a member of the Rashtriya Janata Dal (RJD) political party. His name became famous in the Fodder Scam.

References

External links
 Home Page on the Parliament of India's website

1947 births
2022 deaths
India MPs 2004–2009
Rashtriya Janata Dal politicians
People from Bhagalpur
People from Khagaria district